Atom: Journey Across the Subatomic Cosmos is a non-fiction book by Isaac Asimov. It was initially published on May 31, 1991, by Dutton Adult.

Overview
In it, Asimov presents the atom and subatomic particles in a historical context, beginning with Democritus's original thought experiments and theory of atomism, and ending with then-current knowledge of the fundamental particles.

Contents
The book is separated into twelve chapters, plus the index.

See also
Atom: An Odyssey from the Big Bang to Life on Earth...and Beyond by Lawrence Krauss

References

Isaac Asimov, D. F. Bach, Atom: Journey Across the Subatomic Cosmos,  Plume; Reprint edition (August 1, 1992), 

1991 non-fiction books
Books about the history of physics
Books by Isaac Asimov